Roberto Visconti (Pogliano Milanese , ... - Milan , 8 August 1361) was an Italian Roman Catholic archbishop.

Biography
He was also related to Giovanni II Visconti, and already held a few benefices such as the Provost of Brivio and as the Archpriest of the Metropolitan Church of Milan.

On 29 October 1354, Roberto Visconti was appointed archbishop of Milan. On 5 January 1355, he crowned Emperor Charles IV in St. Ambrose Basilica with the Iron Crown of Lombardy, although other sources claim that Patriarch of Aquileia or the Bishop of Bergamo crowned the Emperor, since Roberto was not consecrated until April 1355.

On 5 December 1355, Roberto Visconti laid the foundation stone of the foundation of the Church of San Giovanni that restored the Basilica di Santa Tecla.

The political power of his Visconti cousins, who ruled the Milan, complicated Roberto's life. Usually, there were only minor conflicts, but in 1360, Pope Innocent VI excommunicated Bernabò Visconti. The latter reputedly uttered the following Latin phrase against the Archbishop of Milan one day when he had refused to carry out Bernabò's orders, due to the excommunication:

Roberto Visconti died on 8 August 1361 in Milan, but according to other sources would have died in his castle in Legnano.

Coat-of-arms

References

Sources:

1361 deaths
Archbishops of Milan
House of Visconti
14th-century Italian Roman Catholic archbishops
Year of birth missing